No Limit is a 1977 jazz album by saxophonist Art Pepper playing with George Cables, Tony Dumas, and Carl Burnett.

As Pepper says in the sleeve notes, he considered this album to be a memento of his friendship with Lester Koenig, who died on 21 November 1977.

Reception
AllMusic reviewer Scott Yanow awarded the album 4.5 stars and wrote that this studio album "has the emotional intensity and chance-taking improvisations of his live concerts of the period".

Track listing
"Rita-San" (Art Pepper) – 7:55
"Ballad Of The Sad Young Men" (Tommy Wolf, Fran Landesman) – 8:41
"My Laurie" (Art Pepper) – 8:25
"Mambo de la Pinta" (Art Pepper) – 12:41

Personnel
Art Pepper – alto saxophone
George Cables – piano
Tony Dumas – bass
Carl Burnett – drums

References

Sources
Richard Cook & Brian Morton. The Penguin Guide to Jazz on CD 4th edition. Penguin, 1998. 

1977 albums
Art Pepper albums